Resurrection is the second album from Australian heavy metal band Dungeon. Recording was fraught with difficulties including a brief period when first Sayers then Grose both left then rejoined the group and the low budget available resulted in poor sound quality; nonetheless Dungeon was courted by Century Media before deciding to have the album released by Warhead Records. It was released in October 1999 as the final release from that label. In 2005, the album was completely re-recorded and released worldwide. The 2005 version featured Lord Tim (vocals, guitar, keyboards, bass), Steve Moore (drums, vocals) and Stu Marshall (guitar, vocals).

Track listing

Songs
The song "The Legend of Huma" is based on the novel The Legend of Huma from the Dragonlance series of books
Three tracks had appeared in different versions on the previous Japan-only release Demolition. These songs were "Paradise", "Time to Die" and "I Am Death". "Paradise" is Dungeon's most recorded track as an even earlier version with a different bass line featured on the "Changing Moods" demo. It was then recorded again for Rising Power in 2003 and a fifth time in 2004. There is also a live version of the track on Under the Rising Sun.
bass player Justin Sayers sings the lead vocal on the tracks "Wake Up" and "Let It Go". "Let It Go" does not appear on the re-recorded version of the album. It was replaced by a track called "Severed Ties". Sayers performs a version of "Wake Up" with his current band Platinum Brunette that features significantly different lyrics.

Personnel
 Lord Tim – vocals, guitar, keyboards
 Steve Moore – drums, vocals
 Dale Corney – guitar, vocals
 Justin Sayers – bass, vocals, lead vocals tracks 5 and 7
 Gustav Hoffman – keyboards (guest)

1999 albums
Dungeon (band) albums